Arbacioida are an order of sea urchins, consisting of a single family, the Arbaciidae. They are distinguished from other sea urchins by the presence of five separate plates around the anus. Unlike their close relatives, the Salenioida, all of the tubercles on their tests are of similar size.

Genera:
Arbacia Gray, 1835
Arbaciella Mortensen, 1910a
Arbia Cooke, 1948†
Baueria Noetling, 1885†
Codiopsis Agassiz, in Agassiz & Desor, 1846†
Coelopleurus Agassiz, 1840a
Cottaldia Desor, 1856 †
Dialithocidaris Agassiz, 1898
Habrocidaris Agassiz & Clark, 1907b
Podocidaris Agassiz, 1869
Pygmaeocidaris Döderlein, 1905
Sexpyga Shigei, 1975
Tetrapygus Agassiz, 1841b

References
 
 

 
Extant Middle Jurassic first appearances